B. vulgaris may refer to:

 Bambusa vulgaris, an open clump type bamboo species
 Barbarea vulgaris, the bittercress, a biennial herb species
 Berberis vulgaris, the European barberry, a shrub species
 Beta vulgaris, the beet, a plant  species
 Bromus vulgaris, the Columbia brome, a grass species native to western North America 
 Byblia vulgaris, a butterfly species found in western Africa

See also
 Vulgaris (disambiguation)